Juan Alejandro Saucedo Ortiz (born June 24, 1994) is a Mexican-born American former professional boxer who competed from 2011 to 2020. who challenged for the WBO light welterweight title in 2018. At regional level he held the WBO-NABO and WBO International light welterweight titles between 2017 and 2018.

Professional career
Saucedo made his professional debut on November 19, 2011, scoring a first-round technical knockout (TKO) victory over Cedric Sheppard at the Reliant Arena in Houston, Texas.

After compiling a record of 25–0 (15 KOs) he faced Gustavo David Vittori for the vacant WBA-NABA (USA) and WBO-NABO light welterweight titles on November 11, 2017 at the Save Mart Center in Fresno, California. After suffering a cut above his left eye from an accidental clash of heads in the second round, Saucedo upped the pressure in the third to score three knockdowns; left hooks twice sent Vittori to the canvas on one knee, with the end coming after another left hook sent him crashing to the canvas, prompting the referee to wave off the fight and award Saucedo the WBA and WBO regional titles via third-round knockout (KO). He defended the titles in his next fight, facing Abner López on March 10, 2018 at the StubHub Center in Carson, California. In a closely contested fight Saucedo retained his titles with a seventh-round KO after dropping López with a left hook to the body.

For his next fight he dropped the WBO-NABO title in an attempt to add the vacant WBO International title to his collection, facing Lenny Zappavigna on June 30, 2018 at the Chesapeake Energy Arena in Oklahoma City. During a gruelling and bloody fight in which both men received cuts – Saucedo over his left eye and Zappavigna over both – Saucedo scored a knockdown in the third round en route to a seventh-round TKO after Zappavigna's corner threw in the towel with 29 seconds left of the round. At the time of the stoppage Saucedo was ahead on the scorecards, with two judges scoring the bout 59–54 while the third scored it 58–55.

Following his win over Zappavigna, Saucedo became the mandatory challenger for the WBO light welterweight champion, Maurice Hooker. The pair squared off on November 16, 2018 at the Chesapeake Energy Arena. Both fighters started the bout with intent; Saucedo moving forward with aggression as Hooker remained on the outside to box at range. Saucedo scored a heavy knockdown in round two, knocking the champion to the canvas with a right hand. Hooker rose to his feet but was visibly hurt, allowing Saucedo to pound away with right hands and uppercuts, leaving the champion with a bloodied nose at the end of the round. Hooker recovered from the knockdown in the next round, sticking behind his trademark jab and landing punches as Saucedo tried to get on the inside. Saucedo found success in the fifth round as he backed the champion onto the ropes, switching his attacks from head to body. Hooker fired back in the final seconds of the round to knock Saucedo off balance. Hooker upped the pressure in the sixth, landing clean punches which began to mark Saucedo's face, causing swelling to his left eye. The pressure continued in the seventh; Hooker landed a right hand which sent Saucedo stumbling into the ropes, prompting referee Mark Nelson to rule it a knockdown and initiate a standing eight count as he deemed the ropes kept Saucedo on his feet. Following Nelson's count, Saucedo was met with a flurry of punches which sent him stumbling across the ring, prompting Nelson to wave off the fight, awarding Hooker a seventh-round TKO victory. At the time of the stoppage Saucedo was losing on the scorecards with two judges scoring the bout 57–56 and the third scoring it 58–55, all in favour of Hooker. According to CompuBox stats, Saucedo landed 133 out of 486 (27%) punches and Hooker landed 174 out of 509 (34%).

After a year out of the ring he came back in November 2019 to defeat Rod Salka via first-round KO in a scheduled eight-round bout.

Professional boxing record

References

Living people
1994 births
American male boxers
Boxers from Chihuahua (state)
Light-welterweight boxers
Welterweight boxers